Basin Mountain may refer to:
Basin Mountain (California)
Basin Mountain (New York)